Chiswell Street is in Islington, London, England. Historic England have seven entries for listed buildings in Chiswell Street.

Location

The street, in St Luke's, Islington, runs east-west and forms part of the B100 road. At the west end it becomes Beech Street, with Silk Street running from the south of that junction, and Whitecross Street heading north. At its east end it meets Finsbury Square.

The western junction marks the boundary of the City of London with Islington: Whitecross and Chiswell (north and east) are in Islington, while Beech and Silk (west and south) are in the City.

Whitbread Brewery
The southern block between Silk Street and Milton Street (once Grub Street) is occupied by the Grade II-listed Whitbread Brewery. In 1750, Samuel Whitbread consolidated production from two smaller breweries, the Goat Brewhouse, where porter was produced, and a brewery in Brick Lane used to produce pale and amber beers, on a much larger site. Considerable expansion followed, and beer was brewed here for 225 years, until it closed in 1976.

Part of the complex is now The Brewery, a conference and events venue, and part of it the Montcalm London City Hotel.

Other buildings
The Jugged Hare pub on the corner with Silk Street is also Grade II listed.

Notable residents 
Type-founder William Caslon's Caslon Type Foundry was based on Chiswell Street for almost exactly two hundred years.

References

Streets in the City of London